= Młodzież Stalinowska =

Defunct Polish communist newspaper

- Editor: Stanisław Ludwikiewicz Gruszkiewicz
- Founded: 1 June 1941
- Political alignment: Communist
- Language: Polish
- Headquarters: Kościuszko Street, Lvov
- Country: Soviet Union
- Circulation: 20,000
- Sister newspapers: Leninskaya Molod

Młodzież Stalinowska ('Stalin Youth') was a Polish language newspaper published in Lvov, as an organ of the Lvov City and District Committees of the Leninist Young Communist League of Ukraine. The decision to launch the newspaper was taken in April 1941. The first issue was published on 1 June 1941. The newspaper came out thrice a week. It was modelled after the Ukrainian language communist youth organ Leninskaya Molod. Stanisław Ludwikiewicz Gruszkiewicz, journalist from the Kiev newspaper Głosu Radzieckiego, served as the editor of Młodzież Stalinowska.

The editorial office of Młodzież Stalinowska was located on Kościuszko Street. The newspaper had a circulation of 20,000 copies. The format of the newspaper was 42 x 63 cm, issues of the newspaper contained four pages.
